The pale pygmy jerboa or pallid pygmy jerboa (Salpingotus pallidus) is a species of rodent in the family Dipodidae endemic to Kazakhstan.

References

Endemic fauna of Kazakhstan
Mammals of Central Asia
Salpingotus
Taxonomy articles created by Polbot
Mammals described in 1984